Champagne In Seashells is the 2nd release by Liam Finn, his first with Eliza-Jane Barnes. The EP was recorded at Neil Finn's Roundhouse Studios in New Zealand and released on 21 September 2009. Liam Finn had been touring constantly for about two years with Barnes, heavily influencing the EP's theme of homesickness. The vinyl of Champagne in Seashells was released on Finn's label New Adventure. It includes a bonus track Captain Cat Is Crying with lines from the Dylan Thomas poem Under Milk Wood.

Track listing
All songs written by Liam Finn, except where noted

 Plane Crash - 3:44
 Long Way to Go (Finn, Barnes) - 2:46
 Won't Change My Mind (Finn, Barnes) - 6:34
 Honest Face - 3:43
 On Your Side (Finn, Barnes) - 3:19

Vinyl Track listing

All songs written by Liam Finn, except where noted

 Plane Crash  - 3:44
 Long Way to Go (Finn, Barnes) - 2:46
 Won't Change My Mind (Finn, Barnes) - 6:34
 Honest Face  - 3:43
 On Your Side (Finn, Barnes) - 3:19
 Captain Cat is Crying - 8:30

Charts

References

Liam Finn albums
2009 EPs